Cristina, l'Europa siamo noi (Cristina: We are Europe) is a television series broadcast on Rete 4 in autumn 1991 with Cristina D'Avena, directed by Francesco Vicario, within the program Cartonissimi. It is the last television series starring Cristina D'Avena.

Plot
Cristina, Francesca, Julia, left home and moved it to Julia's grandparents, and then began working as a singer and television host, knowing Edward, a boy who becomes her manager.

See also
List of Italian television series

External links
 

Italian television series
Rete 4 original programming